Christopher Michael Cardone, OP (December 20, 1957) is an American prelate of the Roman Catholic Church.  Since 2016, Cardone has been serving as archbishop and metropolitan of the Archdiocese of Honiara in the Solomon Islands.

Biography

Early life and education

Christopher Cardone was born on December 20, 1957, in Long Island, New York.  He attended Providence College and made his religious profession to the Dominican Order on August 15, 1981. He completed his studies at the Dominican House of Studies in Washington, D.C.

Priestly ministry

Cardone was ordained as a Dominican priest on May 30, 1986.  After his ordination, Cardone served for two years as a parish priest at St. Gertrude Parish in Madeira, Ohio. In 1988, Cardone moved to the Dominican vicariate in the Solomon Islands.  He held positions on the island of Gizo as a parish priest in Nila and Nora; pastor of St. Peter's Parish in Gizo, and as director of vocations for the Diocese of Gizo.

Episcopal ministry

Cardone was appointed titular bishop of Thuburnica and as an auxiliary bishop to the  Diocese of Gizo on March 27, 2001, by Pope John Paul II.  Bishop Bernard O'Grady consecrated Cardone on June 9, 2001. Cardone was appointed bishop of the Diocese of Auki on Oct 19, 2004, by Pope John Paul II.

Cardone made an Ad Lumina visit to Pope Benedict XVI in Rome as a member of the delegation from Papua New Guinea and the Solomon Islands on June 26, 2005. Cardone was appointed as archbishop of the Archdiocese of Honiara by Pope Francis on June 22, 2016.  He was installed on September 10, 2016.

See also

 Catholic Church hierarchy
 Catholic Church in the United States
 Historical list of the Catholic bishops of the United States
 List of Catholic bishops of the United States
 Lists of patriarchs, archbishops, and bishops

References

External links

 

21st-century Roman Catholic bishops in Oceania
1958 births
Living people
People from New York (state)
Roman Catholic bishops in the Solomon Islands
Roman Catholic archbishops in Oceania
Roman Catholic bishops of Auki
Roman Catholic archbishops of Honiara
21st-century American Roman Catholic priests
American expatriate bishops
Dominican bishops